Luquetia is a moth genus of the superfamily Gelechioidea described by Patrice J.A. Leraut in 1991. It is mostly placed in the family Depressariidae, which is often – particularly in older treatments – considered a subfamily of the Oecophoridae or included in the Elachistidae.

Species
 Luquetia lobella (Denis & Schiffermüller, 1775)
 Luquetia orientella (Rebel 1893)

Footnotes

References
  (2009): Luquetia. Version 2.1, 2009-DEC-22. Retrieved 2011-OCT-31.
  (2004): butterflies and moths of the World, Generic Names and their Type-species – Depressaria. Version of 2004-NOV-05. Retrieved 2010-APR-24.
  (2009): Markku Savela's Lepidoptera and Some Other Life Forms – Luquetia. Version of 2003-DEC-29. Retrieved 2011-OCT-31.

Depressariinae